Table tennis at the 2019 Pacific Games in Apia, Samoa was held on 8–13 July 2019 at the Lotopa Harvest Centre. The sport also included para-athletes.

Medal summary

Medal table

Table tennis

Para table tennis

See also
 Table tennis at the Pacific Games

References

2019 Pacific Games
Pacific Games